Anandalok Puraskar or Anandalok Awards ceremony is one of the most prominent film events given for Bengali Cinemas in India. Anandalok, the only Bengali language film magazine, is published by Ananda Publishers; Ananda Bazar Patrika presents this award.

Winners

See also

 List of Asian television awards

References

Awards established in 1993
Bengal film awards
Civil awards and decorations of West Bengal
Indian television awards